Piran Bishop (born 1961) is a British portraitist.

Early career

Bishop is based in Exeter, and studied at Art Colleges in Exeter and Brighton. He was sketched by Robert Lenkiewicz as a child, and became a "casual student" of his from 1994 until Lenkiewicz's death in 2002. Bishop is the subject of several portraits by Lenkiewicz.

Before settling to a career as a portraitist, Bishop worked for Exeter City Council as a local archaeological and architectural illustrator; some of his sketches are still used by the City Council as educational and reference materials.

Portraits

Bishop usually works in oil on canvas.

Commercial commissions include a series of eight portraits of adult learners for Ufi/learndirect, painted between January and March 2001. Bishop described the series as his "biggest project to date".

Some of Bishop's private commissions can be seen on his website.

Exhibitions
Bishop has exhibited at the Mall Galleries in London and at several South-West galleries, including The Royal Albert Memorial Museum and Art Gallery, and the Coombe Farm Gallery. His work is also exhibited at the Form Contemporary Craft Gallery in Blaenavon.

References

External links
Piran Bishop's commercial website
Investigating the Portraiture of Piran Bishop and Robert Lenkiewicz

Modern painters
20th-century English painters
English male painters
21st-century English painters
Living people
1961 births
20th-century English male artists
21st-century English male artists